Niranjan Reddy may refer to 

Singireddy Niranjan Reddy  (born 1958) is an Indian politician, and a minister from Telangana
S. Niranjan Reddy  (born 1970) is an Indian lawyer, film producer and politician, and a Member of Parliament in Rajya Sabha from Andhra Pradesh